Melnbārdis (feminine: Melnbārde) is a Latvian surname. Notable people with the surname include:

 Alberts Melnbārdis (1888–1957), Latvian chess player
 Armands Melnbārdis, Latvian-born musician and recording artist 

Latvian-language masculine surnames